CSUR may refer to:

 ACM Computing Surveys, a peer reviewed scientific journal 
 ConScript Unicode Registry, a project to maintain a registry of scripts and the codes assigned to them